The Western Approaches Tactical Unit (WATU) was a unit of the British Royal Navy created in January 1942 to develop and disseminate
new tactics to counter German submarine attacks on trans-Atlantic shipping convoys. It was led by Captain Gilbert Roberts and was principally staffed by officers and ratings from the Women's Royal Naval Service (Wrens). Their primary tool for studying U-boat attacks and developing countermeasures was wargames. After the U-boat threat to merchant shipping was defeated, WATU continued to develop anti-submarine tactics for later stages of the war, including Operation Overlord and the Pacific War. WATU trained naval officers in its tactics by hosting week-long training courses in which the students played wargames. WATU formally ceased operations at the end of July 1945.

Mission
During World War I, German submarines (U-boats) sank merchant ships in the Atlantic Ocean so as to deny supplies to Germany's enemies in Europe. Britain reacted by organizing the merchant ships into convoys which were escorted by warships armed with depth charges. This strategy proved effective at repelling U-boats. During the inter-war years, Germany secretly developed new submarine tactics to counter the convoy system. The products of this research were the "wolfpack" tactics, wherein submarines would attack convoys in groups, exploiting the weaknesses of the convoy system, and new advances in submarine technology.  The British, by contrast, had neglected to study submarine tactics during the inter-war years. They entered World War II assuming that the U-boats would operate much as they had during the previous war, unaware that the Germans would come at them with new tricks.

As soon as Britain declared war on Germany (3 Sept 1939), Germany sent its U-boats to attack transatlantic shipping.  The U-boats had a devastating effect. In 1938, Britain had received 68 million tons of imports, but in 1941 the U-boats reduced this to 26 million.  Britain was not a self-sufficient nation, and eventually its reserves of food would run out and it would be forced to capitulate to prevent a famine. In March 1941, Prime Minister Winston Churchill declared that Britain was fighting "the Battle of the Atlantic", and made anti-submarine warfare a top priority.

The Royal Navy understood from intercepted radio transmissions  that the U-boats were operating in coordinated groups but did not know the specifics of their tactics. On 1 January 1942, Admiral Cecil Usborne assigned Commander Gilbert Roberts to establish a wargaming unit at the Western Approaches Command in Liverpool, to analyze the submarine attacks and develop defensive tactics. Roberts had designed naval wargames during a two-year stint at the Portsmouth Tactical School, using them to develop new strategies and tactics. Additionally, Roberts was a gifted communicator who would be able to train commanders in the tactics he was to develop.

Roberts moved to Liverpool to set up his tactical unit on the top floor of the Western Approaches headquarters. This assignment officially began on 23 February 1942. Most of the staff at Western Approaches were women from the Women's Royal Naval Service (colloquially referred to as "Wrens"), and likewise Roberts recruited most of his staff from the Wrens. At total of sixty-six Wrens served at WATU from 1942 to 1945.

Roberts and his team reviewed battle reports from convoy escort commanders, recreated the battles in wargames in order to deduce how the U-boats were operating, and then devised tactics by which the escorts could defeat the U-boats. Their first product was a tactic codenamed Raspberry (see below). As well as devising tactics, WATU also trained naval officers in their use by having them participate in wargames. The training course lasted six days, from Monday to Saturday, and was held every week from February 1942 to the last week of July 1945. Up to fifty officers at once took the course. WATU not only trained British officers, but also officers from other countries such as Canada, the United States, New Zealand, Norway, South Africa, Poland, and Free France.

In May 1943, Admiral Karl Doenitz ordered the U-boats to withdraw from the Atlantic, allowing merchant convoys to pass unmolested.

By 1944, WATU's existence was public knowledge. A journalist visited WATU in January 1944 to observe a wargame and published a short article in The Daily Herald. An exposé appeared in Illustrated magazine the following month.

WATU continued to develop anti-submarine tactics and train officers until the end of the war. It officially ceased operations at the end of July 1945. It had trained close to 5,000 officers over its lifetime.

Legacy
After WATU was closed, Admiral Horton sent the following signal to its former members: "On the closing down of WATU I wish to express my gratitude and high appreciation of the magnificent work of Captain Roberts and his staff, which contributed in no small measure to the final defeat of Germany." Admiral Noble sent Roberts a letter in which he wrote: "...you had a great deal to do in winning the war because if we hadn’t won the Battle of the Atlantic we should undoubtedly have lost the war!"

What makes WATU a noteworthy episode in the history of military wargaming is that it was the first instance where wargames were used to develop solutions on the fly to problems that were occurring in an ongoing war. Up to that point, most wargames were played during peacetime to prepare officers for potential wars, and the scenarios they explored either were hypothetical or happened many years ago. This was made possible by communications technologies that were not available to wargamers in earlier eras (radio and telephone).

The training course provided by WATU appears in the 1951 novel The Cruel Sea (referred to as the "Commanding Officers' Tactical Course"). The author, Nicholas Monsarrat, had attended WATU during his service in the war. The scene did not appear in the 1953 movie adaptation.

Headquarters
Western Approaches Command was an operational command of Britain's Royal Navy, tasked with safeguarding British shipping in the Western Approaches (the seas to the west of Ireland and Britain). Initially headquartered in Plymouth, on the southern coast of Britain, it was moved north to Liverpool in February 1941. After France had fallen to the Germans, North Atlantic shipping convoys had been diverted around the north of Ireland to evade the German navy. Relocating Western Approaches Command to Liverpool sped up communications. Its headquarters was Derby House, a building located behind Liverpool's town hall; today the headquarters is a museum. The top floor, comprising eight rooms, was allocated to WATU. Most of the staff at Western Approaches HQ were women from the Women's Royal Naval Service. Colloquially, they were referred to as "Wrens". When Roberts arrived at Western Approaches in January 1942, its commander-in-chief was Admiral Percy Noble, who was replaced by Admiral Max Horton in November 1942.

Staff
A total of sixty-six women from the Women's Royal Naval Service (Wrens) served at WATU from 1942 to 1945.

Captain Gilbert Roberts - Director of WATU. Once commanded a destroyer but contracted tuberculosis in late 1938 and was barred from serving at sea.
Mary Poole - WRNS officer. The first female officer to take the WATU course.
Laura Janet Howes - WRNS officer. Born in Antigua. Mathematical prodigy. Nicknamed "Bobby".
Elizabeth Drake - WRNS officer. When WATU was established, she was already working at Derby House as a plotter.
Nancy Wales - WRNS officer. Born in Kingston upon Hull, joined the Wrens in 1941. She was a passionate hockey player, and was selected for her understanding of team tactics.
Jean Laidlaw - WRNS officer. Scottish. Former Sea Ranger and chartered accountant.
Janet Okell - WRNS rating. She was only 19 years old when she joined WATU in January 1942. She served at WATU for the whole duration. Okell was initially trained as a plotter, but she was soon participating in wargames as a player, commanding U-boats and escort ships alike.
June Duncan - WRNS rating. One of WATU's longest serving members.

Overview of the wargames
Gilbert Roberts was first introduced to wargaming during a stint at the Portsmouth Tactical School from 1935 to 1937. Roberts took to wargaming with great enthusiasm, and developed his own rulesets. Roberts' wargames were based on the wargames developed by Fred T. Jane in 1898 (Jane Naval Wargame and Fighting Ships). Despite the strong effect that U-boats had during World War I, Roberts' wargames at Portsmouth did not simulate submarine warfare, nor attacks on merchant convoys. In fact, nobody in the Royal Navy studied submarine warfare through wargames until the establishment of WATU in 1942.

At WATU, the wargames were conducted in the largest room of the top floor of Western Approaches HQ. The floor was covered with brown linoleum and in the center was a painted grid. This grid was the game board, or "the tactical table" as the Royal Navy referred to it. The gridlines were spaced ten inches apart, representing one nautical mile. Around the grid were vertical screens of canvas that had peepholes cut into them. The players who controlled the escort ships had to stand behind the screens and could only view the game board through the peepholes. The players who controlled the U-boats did not stand behind the screens and had an unrestricted view of the game board. The ships and surfaced U-boats were represented on the game board by tiny wooden models. The U-boats' movement lines were drawn in green chalk, a color which contrasted poorly with the brown tint of the floor, such that when viewed from an angle, these lines were practically invisible, so the players behind the screens couldn't make them out. The escort ships' movement lines were drawn with white chalk, which could be clearly perceived by the players behind the screens.

The players were given two minutes per turn to make decisions and give orders. The players issued their orders for their imaginary ships on pieces of paper that they passed to the Wrens—this prevented their opponents on the other side of the room from overhearing. The Wrens would then get down on the floor and compute the outcomes of the players' orders, drawing the trajectories of the ships in chalk. Roberts provided the Wrens with the performance characteristics of all ships concerned: the range of the U-boat's torpedoes, the speed of the ships, their turn speed, the precise capabilities of the escorts' sonar (then known as ASDIC), how engine noise might distort listening attempts, visibility at night, etc.

Tactics developed

Notes on WW2 submarine warfare
Submarines of this era were powered by diesel engines and batteries. They could only use their diesel engines when surfaced, as these needed to breathe air to work. When submerged, the submarine used lead-acid batteries. The batteries could be exhausted after an hour or so of maximum speed underwater. When the batteries were exhausted, the U-boat would be forced to surface for air and recharge the batteries with the diesel engine.

The British were the first to equip their warships with sonar to hunt enemy submarines. They called this technology "ASDIC"; the term "sonar" was later coined by the Americans (this article will use the term "sonar" as it is more widely known). This technology sent loud pings into the water and located a submerged submarine by the echoes. The U-boats could hear these pings, of course, so they would know they were being hunted. ASDIC could be ineffective if there was too much ambient noise in the water. Both the U-boats and the warships also had hydrophones with which they could passively listen for sound in the water.

Merchant ships travelled in convoys, surrounded by a ring of escort warships. The convoy itself moved at a speed of 7 to 8 knots.

U-boats usually attacked at night. The cover of darkness allowed them to travel at surface depth with less risk of being spotted by look-outs. Escort ships were equipped with star shells, which when fired in the air would release a burning flare held aloft by a small parachute. This would illuminate the surface of the water, making it easy to spot a surfaced U-boat.

Warships used depth charges to sink submarines. These are bombs that were dropped into the water around the U-boat. The hydraulic shockwave produced by the explosion would seriously damage if not sink any submarine within 10 metres.

Raspberry

During World War I, the U-boats typically attacked convoys from outside the formation, striking ships at the perimeter. But reports from convoys in 1942 showed that U-boats were sinking ships at the center of the formation. Roberts surmised that the U-boats were somehow sneaking into the formation undetected before firing their torpedoes. Roberts and his team tested various ways by which a U-boat might sneak into a convoy, sink a ship, and escape undetected. Only one tactic worked on the game board: The U-boat snuck into the convoy from the rear, on the surface so that it could use its diesel engine to outpace the convoy. Since these attacks happened at night and the look-outs tended to focus on the front, the U-boat was not easily spotted, and once inside the convoy it was indistinguishable from the other ships on radar. The U-boat would then sink a merchant ship with a torpedo at close range, then submerge to make its escape.

Roberts and his team developed the Raspberry maneuver. Upon seeing a convoy vessel being torpedoed, any escort was to fire two white rockets or Roman candles, then say the word "raspberry" over the radio to commence the maneuver. Any forward escorts maintain course, firing star shells. The escorts to the rear and flanks of the convoy converge towards the convoy at a speed of 15 knots. One rear escort sweeps the stern of the convoy. The other escorts, upon nearing the edge of the convoy, turn around and sweep away from the convoy firing star shells for 10 to 12 minutes. Then they turn and sweep back to their starting position. While doing this, all the ships fire star shells outwards to light up the surface of the water.

Raspberry is likely a development of an earlier maneuver known as Buttercup, which was developed by Frederic J. Walker, an escort commander. Buttercup was criticized by the Admiralty for not having all the escorts sweep for the U-boat in all directions. In Buttercup, the escorts would only sweep to the side of the convoy where the attack was thought to have come from, which meant the U-boat could escape if the escort commander made the wrong call. Additionally, only the escort commander could order the maneuver, which could have caused a fatal delay. By contrast, Raspberry has all the escorts sweep the entire perimeter, and any of the escorts could order the maneuver.

Raspberry was cancelled in May 1943.

Pineapple

Pineapple was designed to be an alternative to Raspberry and Banana. It was to be used when more than one U-boat was attacking the convoy, and was designed to do four things: (1) Force a second U-boat to dive before being able to attack; (2) Give a chance of detecting a U-boat which has already fired torpedoes; (3) Prevent another U-boat from sighting the convoy in any illumination used to detect the U-boat which has already attacked; and (4) Increase chance of detection of any submerged U-boat which is about to attack and to form a greater physical obstruction in the submarine attacking area.

Upon noticing a ship getting torpedoed, any escort fires two white rockets and then says the word "pineapple" over the radio to commence the maneuver. Depth charges are to be set to ten-charge shallow pattern. The escorts keep moving forward in zigzag patterns that are 2 miles wide, searching for the U-boats using sonar, radar, and star shells. The escorts facing the expected direction of the second U-boat fire star shells away from the convoy to search for the second U-boat. They were not to fire star shells into the convoy, and the escorts on the opposite side of the convoy were not to fire star shells at all — this was probably to avoid lighting up the convoy, which would have made it easy for the second U-boat to spot.

Banana

Banana was intended for when a single U-boat attacked the convoy (unlike Pineapple which was intended for pack attacks).  Along with Pineapple, it supplanted Raspberry.

Upon seeing a merchant ship being torpedoed, the escort was to fire two white rockets or Roman candles and signal "banana" over the radio, then begin sweeping with sonar and radar at maximum viable speed. The rear escorts fire star shells outwards, then move into the convoy to sweep with sonar in a zigzag pattern. The first of these escorts to reach the wreck of the torpedoed vessel carries out Operation Observant in the area. The escorts to the flanks of the convoy sweep towards the rear of the convoy until they were abreast of the rear escorts, after which they turn around and sweep forward in a zigzag pattern.  The forward escorts were to sweep forward in a zigzag pattern.

Beta Search

Beta Search was a maneuver by which an escort might be able to locate a U-Boat that it had spotted shadowing a convoy. The manual for escort commanders (Atlantic Convoy Instructions) noted that a single escort had a poor chance of finding and destroying a U-boat, but by assuming the most likely course the U-Boat would take and searching within that vicinity, the odds of success could be raised somewhat. Beta Search was a development of an earlier maneuver developed by Commander Frederic Walker called Alpha Search. The advantage of Beta Search over Alpha Search is that Beta Search persuades the U-boat to move in a specific direction. The disadvantage of Beta Search is that the escort must be fitted with "special plotting equipment" to use it.

In Alpha Search, the escort turns to head straight for the U-boat, which will prompt the U-boat to dive.  The escort then turns 20 degrees.  When the escort reaches the U-boat's "furthest towards" circle, it alters course towards the position the U-boat dived, moving in a zigzag with short legs pattern. Upon passing the location where the U-boat dived, the escort drops a marker in the water, then proceeds for the same distanced zigzagging.  Then it turns 90 degrees towards the convoy and begins a search pattern known as Operation Observant.

In Beta Search, the escort turns towards the U-boat, but not directly towards it. The U-boat would likely react by submerging and following a course parallel to the convoy. The escort then moves towards the U-boat's predicted position along that course (this would be on a roughly 15 degree angle from the bearing on which the U-boat was spotted). When the escort reaches the U-boat's "furthest towards" circle, it starts "zigzagging with short legs".  When the escort passes over the U-boat's predicted line of escape, it was to drop a sea marker in the water.  When the escort reached the U-boat's "furthest away" circle, it was to turn 90 degrees towards the position where the U-boat dived and begin Operation Observant.

Step Aside

Step Aside was a maneuver by which a ship could defend itself from a U-boat armed with acoustic torpedoes, specifically the T5 Zaunkönig torpedo, which the Royal Navy referred to as the GNAT (German Navy Acoustic Torpedo). This torpedo used built-in hydrophones to guide itself to its target by sound. The first use of this torpedo was on 20 September 1943 against convoy ON 202. The Royal Navy was already aware that the Germans had developed an acoustic torpedo through interrogations of captured Germans and decrypted communications. In the attack on ON 202, a frigate was hit in the rear while it was bearing down on the U-boat, something which could only have been done by a homing torpedo. Roberts and his team at WATU developed a maneuver known as Step Aside which was designed to place a warship outside the detection cone of the GNAT as it maneuvered into attack range. Step Aside was communicated by radio to escort commanders at sea on 23 September 1943.

Most convoy escorts were frigates and corvettes, with a maximum speed of 16 to 20 knots. 24 knots was the speed at which the T5 torpedo moved, so ships which could go faster than that (destroyers) could just outrun the torpedo.

Upon sighting a U-boat within 6,000 yards, the ship heads straight for the U-boat at best speed for 2 minutes. It was expected that the U-boat would fire its acoustic torpedo when it saw the ship heading straight for it. After 2 minutes, the ship turns 60 degrees left or right and holds this divergent course for 3 minutes, thereby putting itself outside the acoustic torpedo's detection range. Then the ship turns to head straight for the U-boat again. If the U-boat has not yet dived, the ship repeats the maneuver: sail towards the U-boat for 2 minutes, then turn 60 degrees, etc. The warship repeats this process until the U-boat dives. When the U-boat dives, the ship rushes to the U-boat's diving position, then slows down to do a sonar search.

See also 

 Rodger Winn

Footnotes

Bibliography

 Atlantic Convoy Instructions.
 Captain G. H. Roberts C.B.E., R.N. (1947) The Battles of the Atlantic, Royal United Services Institution. Journal, 92:566, 202-215, DOI: 10.1080/03071844709433989 (Archived at Dropbox)
 

Royal Navy in World War II
British military exercises
Naval education and training in the United Kingdom
Liverpool